Devo Presents Adventures of the Smart Patrol is a CD-ROM video game developed and published by Inscape and co-created by American new wave band Devo. It was released in 1996.

Gameplay
Set in the fictional universe of Spudland, Devo Presents Adventures of the Smart Patrol has the players travel from various places with the members of the Smart Patrol. The player has twelve in-game hours to capture Turkey Monkey, "an insane, horrible freak mutant, the result of a rogue recombinant DNA experiment", and find the cure for osso bucco myelitis, a bone-dissolving disease that forces its victims to walk around in skeleton-like suits. Meanwhile, the player must face off against antagonists such as the health care provider Universal Health Systems and entertainment corporation Big Media, who are suppressing the cure, as well as right-wing fundamentalists known as the Pilgrims. Helping the Smart Patrol are the scientists Sun Wang Pin and Dr. Byrthfood, as well as General Boy and his son Booji Boy.

Development
Devo Presents Adventures of the Smart Patrol was developed and published by Inscape. Devo's founders Gerald V. Casale and Mark Mothersbaugh co-wrote the story to the game. The band was also involved with composing the music and overseeing the graphics.

A soundtrack album was released, featuring the tracks from the game.

Reception

Ty Burr from Entertainment Weekly considered the game to be "a major disappointment on all counts", citing its visuals, gameplay, and buggy navigational controls. Joe Hutsko from GameSpot criticized the game for being impossible to beat.

{{quote|"To think of the trees felled for this game's packaging, the miles of videotape run through, lines of dialog written and hopelessly rewritten, code keyed in and compiled and recompiled, marketing hype worked up and spun out, and raw energy wasted in producing the however many thousands of CDs Inscape agreed to permanently burn this trash into, one can only walk away feeling pity for all of the resources, human or otherwise, that were inexorably drawn into the band's distressing foray into computer gaming."|GameSpot'''s Joe Hutsko.}}

The game was a contender for GameSpot's "Worst Game of the Year", losing to Catfight''.

References

External links

1996 video games
Adventure games
Band-centric video games
Classic Mac OS games
Devo
Fictional mutants
Inscape (company) games
Single-player video games
Video games about birds
Video games about genetic engineering
Video games about mental health
Video games about primates
Video games about viral outbreaks
Video games developed in the United States
Windows games